Ngamiland East is one of the subdistricts of Ngamiland District of Botswana.

Villages 

Bodibeng
Botlhatlogo
Chanoga
Habu
Kareng
Kgakge/Makakung
Komana
Mababe
Makalamabedi
Matlapana
Matsaudi/Sakapane
Maun
Phuduhudu
Sankuyo
Sehithwa
Semboyo
Shorobe
Toteng
Tsao

Localities 

A.1.2 Vet Camp
A.I. Camp
Amusangwana
Audi
B.D.F Camp
Baapelo
Babalelampa
Bamotshaa
Bantshaa
Birds Camp
BLDC Ranch
Bobaatlhogo
Bodirelakgomo
Bodumatau
Bodumatau
Boesi
Bogare
Bohiwakgoma
Boiketso
Boikhutso
Boitapoloso
Boitumelo
Bolapologo
Bomakwhe
Bomoxwa
Bonno
Borakalalo
Boro
Boro B.D.F
Boro Prisons
Boseto Copper Mine
Boseto Copper Mine
Boswelaphiri
Bothakga
Bothulakgomo
Botshabelo
Botshelo
Botshelo
Boura
Buffalo Trials Camp 1
Buffalo Trials Camp 2
Camp
Camp Dizhana
Chelete
Chixoma
Chuchubega
Chuchubega Water Affairs
Crocodile Camp
Daugha
Dautsa
Deception Valley Lodge
Diakwe Quarantine Camp
Dikgakana
Dikgatho
Dikgatlhong (Maun)
Dikgongtseditshweu
Dinao
Dinokwane
Diphalana
Dipuo
Dithapelo
Dithutwana
Ditoro
Ditoro
Ditotoma
Dobe
Gabamochaa
Game
Gaonwe
Gogomoga
Golaobone
Goodhope
Goruku
Gwedao
Gxwegxwa
Hainaveld 66-70 Conservacy
Hitato
Ikageng
Inola
Ipelegeng
Island Safari Lodge
John's Farm
Joo
Jovurega
Kaberekele
Kaepe
Kaibara
Kakanaga
Kamisetso
Kamote
Kanana
Kangoa
Kanjuwe
Kaokemo
Karatshaa
Katoo
Kaure
Kgantshang
Kgaolo
Kgetsiyatsie
Kgolagano
Kgomotshwaana
Kgomotshwaana Gate
Kgopisamotswana
Kgoria
Kgwebe
Khooxoba
Khorotsau
Khudutlou
Khwai Camp
Khwai River Lodge
Khwareng
Kombakata
Konde
Kookale
Koromo
Kouwe
Kumokoga
Kwarabe
Latlhamatla
Lebaleng
Lebu (Ngamiland East)
Lediba
LedibalaDikubu
Legae
Legotlhwana  
Lekurwane
Lentswana
Lentswana
Lerobo
Letlhajwa
Liverpool
Mababe Hunting Camp /
Mabeleapodi
Mabono
Machaba Camp
Machera
Maego
Maile
Maiteko
Majakomabedi
Makakung
Makalamabedi North Gate
Makgabaganyane
Makgabana
Makgadikgadi Wildlife Camp
Makgokong
Makoba
Makolwane
Makula
Makutsomo
Makwelekwele/Makgelekgele
Malalakgakana
Malomatsebe
Maloto
Mangororo
Mankwe Bush Camp
Manoga 1
Mantsentsela
Mapeno
Maphane
Maphane/Thaere
Mapororo
Mapororo Gate
Mapororo Properties
Maputi
Maragana
Maretlwana
Marophe
Marothodi
Marula
Marula
Masabango
Masamo
Maselenyane
Masogwana
Masongwana
Masu
Matabolaga
Mathamagana
Matlhomahibidu
Matsaudi
Matsebe
Matseke
Maumo
Maun Rest Camp
Maun Wildlife
Mawana
Mawana Vet Gate
Menomasweu
Meriroriro
Metsi-a-Kgomo
Metsimotse
Mgotlho Photography Camp
Mmadinotshe
Mmaetsho
Mmakebana
Mmamotaung
Mmatakgomo
Mmatakgomo
Mmumosweu
Mochabeng
Mochabo
Modimonthusa
Modimooteng
Moenyana
Mogapelwa
Mogobewathakadu
Mogorogorowatau
Mogowagowe
Mokgalo
Mokgalo
Mokgalo/Haka
Mokolwane
Mokolwane
Mokutsumo
Molatswana
Mopako
Mophane
Moporota
Moremogolo
Morobana
Morula
Mosarasarane
Moselewapula
Mosetlho
Moshu
Mosimanewadiphiri
Mosumoleele
Motlopi
Motopi Airport
Motopi P.W.D. Camp
Motopi Vet Camp
Mowana (Sehithwa)
Mpayabana
Mpayakgori
Mpayamonna
Mpayanonyane
Mphametsi
Mphampha
Mphampha SSG Camp
Mphoyame
Mphoyamodimo
Mushu
Nagotona
Nakalatswii
Namanyane
Nametsapelo
Namolaleuba
Naone
New Makolwane Camp
Ngoya
Ngwanaitseele
Nisa Vula
Nnakgolo
Ntshapelo
Nxabe
Nxame
Nxanxana
Nxenekau
Nxharaga
Odiakwa
Okavango River Lodge
Palamaokuwe
Pegasegwana
Pelobotlhoko
Pelotelele
Pelotshetlha
Pelotshwaana
Pelotshweu
Pelotshweu
Peteke
Peteke Gate
Phakawe
Phalaphala BDF Camp
Phalaphala Vet Camp
Phatlhana
Phatswe
Phefodiafoka
Phefodiafoka
Phefodiafoka Gates
Phenyo
Phirieatsena
Phuduhudu
Phuduhudu Lands
Phuduhudu wildlife camp
Phuthologo
Polokabatho
Polokabatho
Polokabatho
Qonga
Ramosuwana
Ranch No.80
Riverland/Thaji
Roads Camp
Roads Camp
Roads Maintenance Camp
Roman
Rombale
Rongwa
Sakadana
Samodupi
Sankoyo New Camp
Sankwasa
Santawana Lodge & Work Camp
Sanyana
Seamogano
Sebakhudu
Sedibana
Sedibana
Sedibana
Seerose
Segolame
Segolame
Segolame
Sekwaxamo
Semaotwana
Semente/Kakana
Semolo
Semphete
Seokgwe
Sepanapoleke
Serurubele
Setata Gate
Setata Gate
Setateng
Sethebe
Setsau
Sexaxa
Shandereke/Kaziekene Camp
Shashe
Shendango
Shewaronga
Shirobazo
Shokomokwe
Sitatunga Camp
Somela
Somela 1
South Gate Camp
Sulabompe
Tatamoga
Tauyanamane
Tebogo
Tenge
Thamalakane
Thapolathari
Thari ya Nanane
Thololamoro
Tianoga
Tjivaneno
Tlhalogane
Tolankwe
Tsanekona
Tsaro Elephant Lodge
Tsatsabaga
Tsetseku
Tshadamo
Tshelo jwa Motswana
Tshenolo
Tshimologo
Tshipidi
Tshipidi
Tsholofelo
Tshwaragano
Tshwaragano 1
Tsibogo-la-Matebele
Tsogaboroko
Tsogaobone
Tsoku
Tsoronyatli
Tswelenyane
Tudika
Wild dog Research
Workers Camp & Safari Camp
Xabarachaa
Xabaxwa
Xadora/Nanogaonne
Xaega
Xakukara
Xangoro
Xaraxau Flats
Xhabo SSG Camp
Xhai Pan Turn Off
Xhana
Xharaxhe
Xhatsitso
Xheche
Xheke Lands
Xhiredom
Xhobe
Xhoga
Xhoga SSG Camp
Xhomo
Xhutego
Xhwango
Xhwee
Xininkhwe
Xirixara Wildlife Camp
Xoboga
Xoo
Xoo
Xuxau
Xwamote

References 

North-West District (Botswana)
Populated places in Botswana